Zoltán Lipták (born 10 December 1984) is a Hungarian footballer who is playing for Gyirmót FC Győr.

Club career
He had a trial with League One side Huddersfield Town in January 2007, but the supposed end-of-season loan transfer collapsed mysteriously. In July 2007, he had a trial with Southend United, recently relegated into League One. Manager Steve Tilson said he desperately wanted to sign the 6' 4" defender after impressing in a friendly against Witham Town. The permanent signing of Liptak was completed on 24 July 2007 from Hungarian second division side Lombard-Pápa TFC for a fee of £52,000.

Lipták was sent on loan to Stevenage Borough on 22 November 2007 for one month and made his debut in front of the Setanta Sports cameras against Altrincham in the 2–1 win on 26 November 2007. He joined Újpest FC in June 2008. In February 2009, he signed for Championship team Southampton on loan until the end of the season. He made his first appearance for Southampton against Preston North End when they won 3–1. The loan was terminated at the end of April 2009. He has had the honour of winning the Essex Senior Cup with Southend, in which he scored a dubious goal for the Shrimpers in the final against Chelmsford City.

Videoton
Lipták was signed by Videoton in 2009. He became one of the most important parts of the defense of the club. He won his first Hungarian League title in 2011. During the coaching of György Mezey, he led the club to win the championship. Since the arrival of the Portuguese Paulo Sousa he has been left out from the squad. Although Lipták was a member of the Hungarian national football team, he could not play in his club. Therefore, he was released by Videoton a couple of days before the important Euro 2012 qualifier against Sweden. Lipták was not affected by the difficulties of his club and he played well during the two Euro 2012 qualifiers against Sweden and Moldova. He was a member of two important victories of the national side. In September, Lipták was on trial with Premier League club Swansea City.

Újpest
Lipták signed a contract with Újpest FC.

International career
He has gained 15 under-21 caps for his country. Lipták started his first full international game against England at Wembley Stadium. He played 55 minutes before being substituted, Hungary lost the game 2–1.

Honours

Club
Videoton
Nemzeti Bajnokság I: 2010–11
Győri ETO 
Nemzeti Bajnokság I: 2012–13

Individual
Videoton
Nemzeti Sport Team of the Season (3): 2009–10, 2010–11 Autumn Season, 2010–11

International goals

References

External links
Zoltán Lipták at magyarfutball.hu

1984 births
Living people
People from Salgótarján
Hungarian footballers
Association football defenders
Hungary international footballers
Hungary under-21 international footballers
Szolnoki MÁV FC footballers
Lombard-Pápa TFC footballers
Southend United F.C. players
Stevenage F.C. players
Újpest FC players
Southampton F.C. players
Fehérvár FC players
Győri ETO FC players
Diósgyőri VTK players
Gyirmót FC Győr players
Nemzeti Bajnokság I players
English Football League players
National League (English football) players
Hungarian expatriate footballers
Expatriate footballers in England
Hungarian expatriate sportspeople in England
Sportspeople from Nógrád County